Nick Brewer (born 1989) is an English rapper. His 2015 song, "Talk To Me", charted at #19 on the UK Singles Chart.

Background
Brewer was born in Essex in 1989 but lived in Ilford during his time at the University of Essex, where he studied history, and now operates out of a studio in Brick Lane. He once had a job as a youth worker. He grew up in a church near Ilford, which he still attends to this day. His is passionate about his faith and is involved in all aspects of Christian outreach. Nick Brewer started off as a Christian Grime artist.

Brewer has released four EPs in collaboration with The Confect; 2010's Alone With My Thoughts, 2011's Alone With My Thoughts Part 2, 2013's Flat 10 and 2014's 4 Miles Further, the latter taking its name from the movement of The Confect's home studios to their new set up in Brick Lane. His 2014 single, Fall From Here, featured Naomi Scott.

His 2015 single, "Talk to Me", was written by Brewer and Bibi Bourelly. The song samples "Gypsy Woman" by Crystal Waters. In an interview, Brewer said that Bourelly had been invited into the studio after Brewer found out through a mutual friend that she was in town writing for Ellie Goulding. The song charted at #19 on the UK Singles Chart and was certified Silver by BPI in 2022.

Outside of music, Brewer is passionate about contributing to social change; one example is in him being a patron for UK charity Anxiety UK.

Awards and nominations

MOBO Awards

References

1989 births
Living people
English male rappers
People from Essex
People from Ilford
People from Leytonstone
Rappers from London